Acinetobacter lactucae is a Gram-negative and strictly aerobic bacterium from the genus of Acinetobacter which has been isolated from the plant Lactuca sativa.

References

External links
Type strain of Acinetobacter lactucae at BacDive -  the Bacterial Diversity Metadatabase

Moraxellaceae
Bacteria described in 2016